Tenfoot Bridge is a wooden footbridge across the River Thames in Oxfordshire, England. It is situated on the reach above Shifford Lock and was built in 1869.  It connects Buckland on the south bank to Chimney on the north.

In 1867 there were complaints about the state of the weir bridge and after a dispute, the Thames Conservancy removed the weir and built the bridge two years later.

The Thames Path passes the bridge on the north bank, but does not cross it.  The path formerly crossed the bridge to Duxford south of the old course of the Thames.

See also
Crossings of the River Thames

References

Pedestrian bridges across the River Thames
Bridges in Oxfordshire
Bridges completed in 1869
1869 establishments in England